Wyoming Highway 90 (WYO 90) is a  long north-south Wyoming state highway located in western Converse County southeast of Glenrock. The highway is locally known as Boxelder Road.

Route description
Wyoming Highway 90 is a fairly short state highway located south-southeast of Glenrock named Boxelder Road. Highway 90 begins southeast of Glenrock and north of the community of Boxelder, for which the roadway is named and provides travel to. Highway 90 picks up where Converse County Route 17 leaves off as the roadway begins south-southeast of Glenrock (Converse CR 17 continues south to Boxelder). Highway 90 heads north passing under Interstate 25, but with no interchange between the two highways. A mile after crossing I-25, Highway 90 reaches its northern terminus at I-25 Business / U.S. Routes 20, 26, and 87 in Glenrock.

Major intersections

References

 Official 2003 State Highway Map of Wyoming

External links 

 Wyoming State Routes 000-099
 WYO 90 - I-25 Bus/US-20/US-26/US-87 to Converse CR 17

Transportation in Converse County, Wyoming
090